René Duffort (born 20 April 1923) is a French former professional rugby league and rugby union footballer and coach who represented France national rugby league team and coached them in multiple Rugby League World Cups.

Career
Duffort started to play rugby union for Côte Basque during World War II. At the end of the war, he returned to rugby league, which was forbidden by the Vichy regime between 1941 and 1944 and joins RC Roanne XIII with which he wins two championships in 1947 and 1948 and later, Lyon Villeurbanne XIII, with which he became champion in 1951. Between 1951 and 1953, he joins Celtic de Paris to then return to Lyon in 1953. He earned 22 caps for France and represented France during the 1951 French rugby league tour of Australia and New Zealand.

References

1923 births
Possibly living people
Celtic de Paris coaches
Celtic de Paris players
France national rugby league team coaches
France national rugby league team players
French rugby league coaches
French rugby league players
Lyon Villeurbanne XIII coaches
Lyon Villeurbanne XIII players
RC Roanne XIII players
Rugby league halfbacks
Sportspeople from Landes (department)